Emaft (also Romanized as Emāft) is a village in Rastupey Rural District, in the Central District of Savadkuh County, Mazandaran Province, Iran. After emaft there is a Kangelo Village . At the 2006 census, its population was 108, in 29 families.

References 

Populated places in Savadkuh County